Wendel Raul Gonçalves Gomes or simply Wendel (born May 25, 1984 in São Paulo), is a Brazilian former footballer who played as a defensive midfielder.

Career

Corinthians
The defensive midfielder player started his career at Corinthians in Sao Paulo, with which in 2005 he won the Brazilian championship.

In 2006, he was sent to Fortaleza EC. Wendel returned to the Corithians in 2007, but after 2 games went to FC Ituano. In the summer of 2007, he moved to the LASK Linz. In March and April 2008 he suffered knee injuries, the first of which healed after 11 days, but the second injury required almost 2 months to heal. In his first season in Lask Linz Wendel played 24 games and scored 4 goals. In July 2008 he once again suffered a knee injury. As of 2010 Wendel played for Santo André Brazil.

"U" Craiova
In February 2011, Wendel signed a contract with the Romanian club FC Universitatea Craiova of Liga I.

Honours
Corinthians
Série A: 2005

References

1984 births
Living people
Brazilian footballers
Association football midfielders
Sport Club Corinthians Paulista players
Fortaleza Esporte Clube players
Ituano FC players
Mirassol Futebol Clube players
LASK players
FC U Craiova 1948 players
Guaratinguetá Futebol players
Campeonato Brasileiro Série A players
Campeonato Brasileiro Série B players
Austrian Football Bundesliga players
Liga I players
Brazilian expatriate footballers
Expatriate footballers in Austria
Expatriate footballers in Romania
Pan American Games medalists in football
Pan American Games silver medalists for Brazil
Footballers at the 2003 Pan American Games
Medalists at the 2003 Pan American Games
Footballers from São Paulo